Cilada.com is a 2011 Brazilian comedy film directed by José Alvarenga Jr. and starring Bruno Mazzeo, who also co-wrote the screenplay. Inspired by the sitcom Cilada which also starred Mazzeo, it was released on 8 July 2011 in Brazil. Earning over $14.5 million, Cilada.com is the highest-grossing Brazilian film of 2011. However, it did not reach the year's top fifteen highest grossing films overall in the country.

Cast
Bruno Mazzeo as Bruno
Fernanda Paes Leme as Fernanda
Augusto Madeira as Sandro
Carol Castro as Mônica
Fabiula Nascimento as Suzy
Fúlvio Stefanini as Dr. Leoni
Sérgio Loroza as Marco 'Marconha' André (as Serjão Loroza)
Thelmo Fernandes as Gerson
Dani Calabresa as Regina Kelly
Luis Miranda as Pai Amâncio
Alexandre Nero as Henrique
Fernando Caruso as himself
Marcos Caruso as Camargo
Rita Elmôr as Ferrari

Release

Box office
The film grossed $13,874,130 in Brazil, and $14,576,408 worldwide. It was the highest-grossing Brazilian film released in 2011, though it was not able to reach the top fifteen highest-grossing films overall in Brazil, with the country's box office dominated by foreign films.

Home media
Cilada.com was released on both DVD and Blu-ray in Brazil on 13 February 2012.

References

External links

2011 films
2010s sex comedy films
2011 comedy films
Brazilian comedy films
Films about the Internet
Films shot in Rio de Janeiro (city)
2010s Portuguese-language films